"I Bet You Look Good on the Dancefloor" is a song by English rock band Arctic Monkeys released on 15 October 2005, through Domino Recording Company. The song was the band's first single from their debut studio album, Whatever People Say I Am, That's What I'm Not (2006). Written by lead singer Alex Turner and produced by Jim Abbiss, "I Bet You Look Good on the Dancefloor" is a garage rock, indie rock, and post-punk track. It debuted at number one on the UK Singles Chart on 23 October 2005, and remains one of the band's best-known songs in the UK.

Arctic Monkeys performed the track at the opening ceremony of the 2012 Summer Olympics. The song was ranked at number 7 on NMEs list of The 500 Greatest Songs of All Time. Mike Smith, who signed them to EMI Publishing, claimed that with the release of this track, “Arctic Monkeys created a model that’s absolutely dominant today, The fact that you’re clicking on music to listen to as you did with them – they heralded what we’ve come to live in now.”

Composition and lyrics
The song was recorded three times with different producers, the first version with Alan Smyth, and another with James Ford and Rich Costey, before landing on Abiss' version.

The line "Your name isn't Rio, but I don't care for sand" is a reference to Duran Duran's song "Rio", the song also references Shakespeare's Romeo and Juliet.

Single artwork
The single cover features a young girl, wearing a trainee badge, working the cash register at a supermarket, and has the song title and the name of the band, overimposed in white inside of two black rectangles. The girl in the picture, named Jesse May Cuffe, was discovered by Liverpool's design company, Juno, at a bar. Cuffe, at the time 16, was chosen for the shoot, which took place at a SPAR in Liverpool. She wore a fake uniform, and was constantly mistaken for a store worker by the clients.

Music video
The video is a live recording of the band playing the song in a studio with a small audience watching with both the video and audio taken live. Alex Turner introduces the band and the song and asks viewers not to "believe the hype". The video was shot using three Ikegami 3-tube colour television cameras from the 1980s to give it a more aged effect. The video was inspired by BBC2's television music show The Old Grey Whistle Test.

Legacy
Laura Snapes of The Guardian described the legacy of the single as one of "creation, destruction and transition." The way their early songs were distributed ushered in a new way of releasing music, In 2004 iTunes had launched in the UK and accounted for 17.9% of that year’s singles chart,but by 2005, that number had more than doubled to 36.6%. with the band as a starting point. For music writer Tom Ewing, the rise of the band "gave the impression that a return to the Britpop boom time was upon us". Music business journalist Eamonn Forde thought "Arctic Monkeys were one of those acts, certainly at the mainstream level, that brought those two things together." In regards to the way the Internet could not be seen as both a distribution channel and a social space. Talent booker Alison Howe said, the week of the single release "felt like a moment that a generation would remember for the rest of their lives.”

In February 2008, Alan Wilder, former member of Depeche Mode, criticised the mastering of the song in an open letter on the Side-Line Magazine website. He described its sound as "a bombardment of the most unsubtle, one-dimensional noise." On 27 July 2012,
Once the athletes had gathered in the centre of the stadium, the band performed the song, and a cover of The Beatles' "Come Together" at the 2012 Summer Olympics opening ceremony.

Accolades
On 23 February 2006, the track won Best Track at the 2006 NME Awards—one of three awards won by Arctic Monkeys. One of the B-sides, "Chun-Li's Spinning Bird Kick", was nominated for Best Rock Instrumental Performance at the 2007 Grammy Awards.

In May 2007, NME magazine placed "I Bet You Look Good on the Dancefloor" at number 10 in its list of the 50 Greatest Indie Anthems Ever. In October 2011, NME placed it at number 11 on its list "150 Best Tracks of the Past 15 Years". It was later ranked seventh on their list of the "500 Greatest Songs of All Time," with NME noting that the song is "the perfect encapsulation of what it is to be young, pissed, lusty, angry and skint in modern day Britain."

Cover versions
The Sugababes confirmed in January 2006 that the B-side to "Red Dress" would be a cover version of "I Bet You Look Good on the Dancefloor", which replaced the group's 2005 single "Push the Button" at number one on the UK Singles Chart. Upon the recording of the B-side, the Sugababes said: "When our bosses asked us to think of covers for the B-side, we knew which song we would all love to do." Ben Thompson of The Observer praised Berrabah's "bluesy rasp" as a novelty, while Jimmy Draper of Time Out wrote: "It transforms the punky rave-up into a disco stomper that could make even the staunchiest pop-hater get up and dance".

On June 2007 Tom Jones confirmed he would perform a cover of the track at the Concert for Diana, Jones revealed he was a big fan of the band and wanted to do something different, of the song he said, "It's a great song and I wanted to do it as a surprise for the Princess Diana concert. I haven't been in touch with the lads about it but I hope that they like it." On 1 July 2007, Jones and Joe Perry of Aerosmith performed it live ror the celebration at Wembley Stadium. Reviews of the performance were negative, with The Guardian saying the cover sounded good on paper, but live "it proved horribly wrong". The Times thought Jones should "plead forgiveness" for his decision to cover the track. When asked if Jones had received any feedback from the band, he responded, "No. The only feedback we got were the reviews which said we’d ruined it! We were going to release it, but the reviews were so bad we thought better of putting it out!”.

The song was covered by British funk band Baby Charles and released as a single in 2009. Jayson Greene of Pitchfork was positive towards the cover, and thought the band, "find an easy slinkiness in the groove that feels right for Alex Turner's sidelong, cutting observations." Australian band The Vines released a cover of the song as a bonus track on the Japanese edition of their album Future Primitive, released 3 June 2011.

Track listings

Personnel

Arctic Monkeys
 Alex Turner – lead and backing vocals, lead guitar
 Jamie Cook – rhythm guitar, backing vocals
 Andy Nicholson – bass guitar
 Matt Helders – drums, backing vocals

Technical
 Simon 'Barny' Barnicott – mixing
 Ewan Davies – recording
 Owen Skinner – mixing assistance

Charts

Weekly charts

Year-end charts

Certifications

Release history

References

External links
 
 Arctic Monkeys Worldtour 2006 Mapped on Platial.

2005 debut singles
2005 songs
Arctic Monkeys songs
Domino Recording Company singles
Number-one singles in Scotland
Song recordings produced by Jim Abbiss
Songs written by Alex Turner (musician)
UK Independent Singles Chart number-one singles
UK Singles Chart number-one singles